Christmas Wedding Baby is a 2014 American romance film directed by Kiara C. Jones and starring Kimberley Drummond and Lisa Arrindell Anderson.

The film was released on December 8, 2014.

Plot
Three sisters struggle to find happiness through the holiday season as the youngest sister and bride to be is traumatized when she discovers that her first love has been hired as her wedding photographer.

Cast
Ellease Aponte as Dr. Sabian
Lisa Arrindell Anderson as Lori 
Bernie Ask as Greg
Micah Austin as Zac
Maba Ba as Brent
AnnaMarie Brown as Julia
Kimberley Drummond as Andrea
Jon Fine as Councilman Chambers
Stephen Hill aa Isaac
Cindy Hogan as Nurse Rena
Maria Howell as Miranda
Tad Jennings as Tad
Dustin Kaloostian as Dr. Parise 
Nicole Maahs as Candy
Rita Manyette as Stephanie
Frances Turner as Charlotte
Jason Vendryes as Kendal
Sawandi Wilson as Gabriel

References

External links 

2010s romance films
American romance films
Films about weddings
2014 films
American Christmas films
2010s English-language films
2010s American films